Dino Carlo Reyes Chua (born September 28, 1980) is a Filipino businessman and politician and the current Mayor of Noveleta, Cavite. He is the president of SkyJet Airlines, and also the owner of El Palacio Resort in Coastal Bay, Noveleta, Cavite and One Greenbelt Hotel in Ayala Center, Makati. He is also the president of Palladium Hotels & Resorts with branches in Palawan, Siargao and Boracay. In 2016, he was elected as the youngest mayor of Noveleta, Cavite at the age of 35. In 2004, he became the youngest Vice Mayor of Cavite City at the age of 23. In 2010, he also served as No. 1 Provincial Board Member representing the 1st Congressional District of Cavite (Cavite City, Kawit, Noveleta, Rosario). He also became one of the youngest majority leaders of Cavite Province at the age of 29. He often assumes the position of Acting Vice Governor whenever the Governor or Vice Governor is on-leave.

Biography and career
Chua is the eldest son of Danilo Chua (a businessman and philanthropist) and Corazon Reyes, both natives of Cavite province. Chua traced his political roots from the Reyes family being the great grandson of former Congressman Augusto Reyes Sr., a lawyer who later became Justice during the American regime before he was elected as Representative of Cavite Province in the 1925 Congress. His first cousin, Augusto "GuGu" Reyes III also served as Cavite City Councilor up to 1998. His younger brother, Denver Chua, was also elected as Cavite City Vice Mayor in the May 2016 elections. In 2013, his other brother Davey Reyes Chua served as Vice Mayor of Noveleta, Cavite and was also elected as provincial board member of the First District of Cavite.

Chua finished his high school at San Sebastian College de Cavite in 1996 and graduated his bachelor's degree in Business Administration from De La Salle University -CSB in Taft Avenue, Manila. He also earned units of Bachelor of Law at San Beda College of Law. He also finished his Executive Education at Stanford University, California, U.S.A. He also completed the Municipal Leadership & Governance Program at University of the Philippines. He was awarded as one of the Ten Outstanding Young Men of the Philippines (TOYM Awards) in 2019 and awarded as Most Outstanding Mayor in 2018 and Best Mayor of the Year by Asia Leaders Award in 2020.

After his graduation from college, Chua became the youngest Vice Mayor of Cavite City at the age of 23. He first entered politics when he was elected as the Topnotch City Councilor of Cavite City in the 2004 elections. In that election, he received the highest number of votes ever cast in the history of Cavite City. He became one of the youngest Vice Mayors who served in the whole country. He also topped the 2010 Provincial elections, not only in his district but in the whole province of Cavite, making him the No. 1 Provincial Board Member or Senior Board Member of Cavite Province. He often assumed the position of Acting Vice-Governor and Presiding Officer while the Governor or the Vice-Governor of the province was on leave. In May 2016, Chua ran for Mayor of Noveleta, Cavite and won as the newly elected Mayor of Noveleta with a margin of almost 10,000 votes over his rival, making it the highest margin in the history of the Noveleta elections.

Business
Also a businessman, Chua is the President & Owner of One Greenbelt Hotel located in Ayala Center, Makati (across Greenbelt Mall) and President of Palladium Hotels & Resorts which has properties in Palawan, Siargao & Boaracay. He is also the President of SkyJet Airlines (Magnum Air, Inc.), the country's first boutique airline company. SkyJet launched the first and only jet service to unique and exotic island destinations like Batanes (Basco), direct flights to Siargao Island, daily flights to Coron in Palawan (Busuanga) and Boracay (Caticlan).

At the age of 21, he founded Cavite's first FM radio station, 91.9 The Bomb FM in 2002. He is also the co-founder of another FM radio station in Metro Manila, Blazin' 105.9 FM which later became U-Radio in partnership with the legendary Ramon "RJ" Jacinto, Radio High 105.9 (now 105.9 Like FM). He is also the owner of El Palacio Hotel & Resort located in Coastal Bay City, Noveleta, Cavite. His most recent hotel venture is Makati's newest business boutique hotel, One Greenbelt Hotel, located at Ayala Center, Makati with plans to open more hotel properties in Coron, Palawan, Batanes and Boracay. He is currently building his first venture in Community Mall Business being the developer of Bacoor Town Center along Aguinaldo Highway in Bacoor City, Cavite in partnership with Metro Gaisano Mall of Cebu. The anchor tenants in his Bacoor mall project include Shakey's Pizza, Kenny Rogers Roasters, Planters Bank and Metro Supermarket. He was also behind the first ever mall project in Cavite City, the Regada Center Mall, along P. Burgos Avenue, Cavite City (near the public market). He also became the franchise owner of Padis Point restobar in Cavite, co-owner of Culture Club in Eastwood City, Libis, co-owner of ClubV Ultimate bar in Mile Long, Makati, executive producer of Delta Records Corp. and developer/President of DeltaLand Realty Corporation. He is also a co-owner of Cafe Algeria in Forbestown, BGC.

Affiliations
Chua is also the founder of Manny Pacquiao's Party-list, the PBA Party-list also known as Pwersa ng Bayaning Atleta, which focuses on the empowerment of youth and sports development in the Philippines. The PBA party list also elected and won a seat in the 15th congress to represent the sports sector.

Chua is well affiliated in various Non Government Organizations (NGO) being the past President of Cavite "Magiting" Jaycees, Charter President of Rotary Club of Cavite Central, Charter President of Kiwanis Club of Noveleta and a member of Freemason Bagong Buhay Lodge 17. He is also a member of Lex Leonum Fraternitas, a law based fraternity in San Beda College of Law.

In 2010, he was elected as the Topnotch Provincial Board Member of Cavite representing the 1st District, making him the youngest elected provincial official and member of Sangguniang Panlalawigan at the age of 29. He is the majority floor leader and the Chairman of the Powerful Committee on Rules and Committee on public works.

See also 
 Partido Magdalo
 Jerry Codiñera of PBA Partylist

References

External links 
 Cavite Province official website
 Dino Reyes Chua official website
 Cavite Informational website
 Facebook Page of Dino Reyes Chua
 PBA Party-list official website (archived)

1980 births
De La Salle University alumni
Laban ng Demokratikong Pilipino politicians
Lakas–CMD politicians
Living people
Mayors of places in Cavite
Members of the Cavite Provincial Board
Nacionalista Party politicians
United Nationalist Alliance politicians
Partido Magdalo politicians
People from Cavite City
People's Champ Movement politicians
San Beda University alumni
Filipino politicians of Chinese descent